The Channel Force was a temporary squadron of the British Royal Navy during the Second World War that was based at Portland, England from September to October 1939. 
    
It was under the command of Rear-Admiral Lancelot Holland throughout the period.

History
The Channel Force was a powerful squadron established at Portland on 3 September 1939 to deal with any attempt by the Germans to operate light forces in the southern part of the North Sea, certain cruisers and destroyers were detached from the Home Fleet to be based on the Humber. It was under direct operational control by the Admiralty until 7 October 1939 when it was dispersed.

The force was formed with ships from both Commander-in-Chief, Portsmouth and Commander-in-Chief, Plymouth.

Components
Components of the force included:

References

Royal Navy ad hoc formations
Military units and formations of the Royal Navy in World War II
Military units and formations established in 1939
Military units and formations disestablished in 1939